The Charleroi Tigers were a minor league baseball team based in Charleroi, Pennsylvania from 1934 until 1936. However the team can be traced back to 1927 as the Charleroi Babes of the Middle Atlantic League.  The name of the club changed in 1929 to the Charleroi Governors.  The Governors ended play in the league in 1931; however, a Charleroi Tigers began play in 1934, as an affiliate of the Detroit Tigers, in the Pennsylvania State Association, and continued to play until 1936.

Notable alumni
Walt Bashore
Allen Benson
Slick Coffman
Harry Gumbert
Johnny Johnson
Joe Klinger
Danny Litwhiler
Fred Lucas
Roy Parmelee
Bob Rice
Maurice Van Robays
Earl Smith
Art Stokes
Kemp Wicker

References

Baseball teams established in 1927
Baseball teams disestablished in 1936
Defunct minor league baseball teams
Detroit Tigers minor league affiliates
1927 establishments in Pennsylvania
1936 disestablishments in Pennsylvania
Defunct baseball teams in Pennsylvania
Washington County, Pennsylvania
Pennsylvania State Association teams